Colne railway station serves the town of Colne, in Lancashire, England, which is situated close to Pendle Hill. The station, which is managed by Northern, is the eastern terminus of the East Lancashire Line. Trains from Blackpool South run through Preston and Blackburn to Burnley and Colne.

Currently the station only has a single platform and a shelter. The old station was demolished in 1971, after the closure of the line from Colne to Skipton, which had occurred in the previous year.

History
The station became an end-on junction with the East Lancashire Railway's Blackburn, Burnley, Accrington and Colne Extension Railway, which opened on 1 February 1849. By 2 April in the same year the line was part of a through route between Leeds and Liverpool, but the majority of passenger trains east of Colne were local between Skipton and Colne.

The station was rebuilt in 1883 with two engine sheds - one for the Midland Railway to the east, one for the Lancashire and Yorkshire Railway to the west (these two companies now owning the respective lines).

The Beeching cuts of 1964/5 reduced the services along the Skipton–Colne line, and on 2 February 1970 this section closed to all traffic. A year later the station was downgraded to an unstaffed halt following the dismantling of the route towards Earby, the singling of the surviving line from Nelson and the abandonment of the eastbound island platform - all trains henceforth used the former westbound platform, which had its buildings demolished & replaced by a simple waiting shelter. The remainder of the branch from Gannow Junction (near ) to Nelson was also reduced to single track in December 1986 and so the entire line from there is now operated as a  "long siding" with no intermediate passing loops (this restricts the service frequency that can operate along the branch, as only one train can be on the branch at a time).

Colne is therefore in the unusual position of having been a western terminus (1848-1849), a through station (1849-1970) and an eastern terminus (1970 to present). The Skipton - East Lancashire Rail Action Partnership campaigns to reinstate the Skipton–Colne line.

Facilities

Though unstaffed, the station now has a ticket machine in place to allow travellers to buy or collect tickets prior to travelling. Passenger information screens and a PA system have also been installed to provide train running information for users.  A ramp provides step-free access from the station car park and main road to the platform.

Services

The station has an hourly service six days a week to Preston via  serving all local stations en route.  On Sundays only, trains continue through to  - these used to run hourly, but since the winter 2022 timetable change have reverted to every two hours.

References

Bibliography
 Binns, D. (1984), Steam in Airedale, Wyvern Publications, Skipton, 
 Frater, A. (1983) Stopping Train Britain - A Railway Odyssey, Hodder & Staughton Ltd, London. 
 Rush, R.W., (1983), The East Lancashire Railway, The Oakwood Press, 
 Suggitt, G. (2004 reprint), Lost Railways of Lancashire, Countryside Books, Newbury, 
 Taylor, S., (1994), The Railways of Colne, Lancashire, Scenes from the Past No. 23, Foxline Publishing,

External links

Railway stations in the Borough of Pendle
DfT Category F1 stations
Former Lancashire and Yorkshire Railway stations
Former Midland Railway stations
Railway stations in Great Britain opened in 1848
Northern franchise railway stations
Colne